Monte Barraù (also known as Monte Barracù) is a mountain in the Monti Sicani, in Sicily, southern Italy.

Etymology
The mountain's name is derived from the Arabic ra’s e ĝabal bū ‘r-rahū, Latinized as Burrachu.

Description
Monte Barraù has a rather sloped relief, characterized by tertiary clay deposits and Mesozoic carbonates that present sometimes sub-vertical walls with significant rock outcrops and frequent collapses.

Environment
Monte Barraù is rich with spring waters and forests dominated by evergreen oak; secondary aspects are represented by shrublands and xerophilous grasslands.
A recent archaeological research expedition led to the identification of twelve sites featuring pottery concentrations spanning from the Middle Copper Age and Bronze Age, the Classic period, and the Middle Ages to the Late Modern period. Also identified were four areas with dry-stone structures related to Late Modern Age pastoral activities.

The relief is included in a Special Area of Conservation under directives Natura 2000 code ITA020037.

References

Barraù